In the mathematical field of graph theory, the odd graphs are a family of symmetric graphs with high odd girth, defined from certain set systems. They include and generalize the Petersen graph.

Definition and examples
The odd graph  has one vertex for each of the -element subsets of a -element set. Two vertices are connected by an edge if and only if the corresponding subsets are disjoint. That is,  is the Kneser graph .

 is a triangle, while  is the familiar Petersen graph.

They include the odd graphs and the folded cube graphs.

History and applications
Odd graphs have been studied for their applications in chemical graph theory, in modeling the shifts of carbonium ions. They have also been proposed as a network topology in parallel computing.

The notation  for these graphs was introduced by Norman Biggs in 1972. Biggs and Tony Gardiner explain the name of odd graphs in an unpublished manuscript from 1974: each edge of an odd graph can be assigned the unique element which is the "odd man out", i.e., not a member of  either subset associated with the vertices incident to that edge.

Properties
The odd graph  is regular of degree . It has  vertices and  edges.

Distance and symmetry
If two vertices in  correspond to sets that differ from each other by the removal of  elements from one set and the addition of  different elements, then they may be reached from each other in  steps, each pair of which performs a single addition and removal. If , this is a shortest path; otherwise, it is shorter to find a path of this type from the first set to a set complementary to the second, and then reach the second set in one more step.

Every odd graph is 3-arc-transitive: every directed three-edge path in an odd graph can be transformed into every other such path by a symmetry of the graph.
Odd graphs are distance transitive, hence distance regular. As distance-regular graphs, they are uniquely defined by their intersection array: no other distance-regular graphs can have the same parameters as an odd graph.

Because odd graphs are regular and edge-transitive, their vertex connectivity equals their degree, .

Odd graphs with  have girth six; however, although they are not bipartite graphs, their odd cycles are much longer. Specifically, the odd graph  has odd girth . If an -regular graph has diameter  and odd girth , and has only  distinct eigenvalues, it must be distance-regular. Distance-regular graphs with diameter  and odd girth  are known as the generalized odd graphs, and include the folded cube graphs as well as the odd graphs themselves.

Independent sets and vertex coloring
That is,  has  different independent sets of size .

Each vertex of the independent set is adjacent to  vertices of the matching, and each vertex of the matching is adjacent to  vertices of the independent set. Because of this decomposition, and because odd graphs are not bipartite, they have chromatic number three: the vertices of the maximum independent set can be assigned a single color, and two more colors suffice to color the complementary matching.

Edge coloring
However, and  can each be edge-colored with  colors.

Biggs explains this problem with the following story: eleven soccer players in the fictional town of Croam wish to form up pairs of five-man teams (with an odd man out to serve as referee) in all 1386 possible ways, and they wish to schedule the games between each pair in such a way that the six games for each team are played on six different days of the week, with Sundays off for all teams. Is it possible to do so?

Hamiltonicity
As the odd graphs are vertex-transitive, they are thus one of the special cases with a known positive answer to Lovász' conjecture on Hamiltonian cycles in vertex-transitive graphs. Biggs conjectured more generally that the edges of  can be partitioned into  edge-disjoint Hamiltonian cycles. When  is odd, the leftover edges must then form a perfect matching. For , the odd number of vertices in  prevents an 8-color edge coloring from existing, but does not rule out the possibility of a partition into four Hamiltonian cycles.

References

External links

Parametric families of graphs
Regular graphs